"Come Sunday" is a piece by Duke Ellington, which became a jazz standard. It was written in 1942 as a part of the first movement of a suite entitled Black, Brown and Beige. Ellington was engaged for a performance at Carnegie Hall on January 23, 1943, for which he wrote the entire composition (that whole concert was released in 1977 as The Carnegie Hall Concerts: January 1943). In 1958 he revised the piece and recorded it in its entirety for the 1958 album of the same name. "Come Sunday" was originally a centerpiece for alto saxophone player Johnny Hodges; the 1958 album, which contained a vocal version of the piece with new lyrics by Ellington featuring gospel singer Mahalia Jackson, greatly increased its popularity.

Notable recordings
Duke Ellington – Black, Brown and Beige (rel. 1946), recording of 1943 Carnegie Hall concert
Duke Ellington – Black, Brown and Beige (1958, with Mahalia Jackson)
Abbey Lincoln – Abbey Is Blue (1959)
Dizzy Gillespie – A Portrait of Duke Ellington (1960)
Eric Dolphy – Iron Man (rec: 1963, rel: 1968)
Dee Dee Bridgewater – Prelude to a Kiss: The Duke Ellington Album (1996)

See also
List of jazz standards

References

1940s jazz standards
1943 songs
Compositions by Duke Ellington